Little Beaver State Park is state park in Raleigh County, West Virginia. The park sits on the shores of 18-acre (0.07 km²) Little Beaver Lake.

Features
 Picnic area
 Playground
 Hiking trails
 Mountain biking trails
 Fishing in Little Beaver Lake
 Boat rentals at Little Beaver Lake
 46-site Campground

Little Beaver Dam

Little Beaver Dam is a historic dam located in the park, near Crow. It was built between 1938 and 1942, as a federally supported project of the Works Progress Administration and Civilian Conservation Corps. The dam measures 400 feet long and 29 feet high and is faced with rough chiseled sandstone.

It was listed on the National Register of Historic Places in 1998.

History
Originally a day-use facility, Little Beaver received a 46-site campground in 2011.  30 sites, opened on July 1 of that year, have electric and water hookups with an additional 16 water-only sites planned to open later in the year.

Accessibility

Accessibility for the disabled was assessed by West Virginia University. The 2005 assessment found the park to be accessible.

See also

 Little Beaver Dam
 List of West Virginia state parks

References

External links
 

Campgrounds in West Virginia
Protected areas established in 1972
Protected areas of Raleigh County, West Virginia
State parks of West Virginia
IUCN Category III
National Register of Historic Places in Raleigh County, West Virginia